Viktor Petrovich Balabin (Russian: Виктор Петрович Балабин, born 1811, died 4 November 1864) was a Russian diplomat and ambassador. From 1860 to 1864, he was Russian ambassador to Austria.

References 

1811 births
1864 deaths
Ambassadors of the Russian Empire to Austria
Russian untitled nobility
19th-century people from the Russian Empire
Privy Councillor (Russian Empire)